Creator is a family of single-board computers developed by Imagination Technologies to promote educational research and software development based on the MIPS architecture. The first board in the platform, the Creator Ci20, was released in August 2014. A second development kit called Creator Ci40 was introduced through a Kickstarter campaign in November 2015.

Hardware

Creator Ci20 
The Creator Ci20 board is based on an Ingenic JZ4780 mobile-class application processor, which contains a dual-core 1.2 GHz MIPS32 CPU with 32k I&D L1 cache and 512k L2 cache and an IEEE754 Floating Point Unit, coupled with a PowerVR SGX540 GPU. This processor supports MXU, a 32-bit SIMD extension. In addition, the board provides:

 8 GB of flash and 1 GB of DDR3 SDRAM memory
 Video playback up to 1080p
 AC97 audio, via 4-pin input/output jack and HDMI connector
 Camera interface – ITU645 controller
 Connectivity – 10/100Mbit/s Ethernet, 802.11b/g/n, Bluetooth 4.0
 HDMI output up to 2K resolution
 2 x USB – host and OTG
 14-pin EJTAG connector
 2 x UART, GPIO, SPI, I2C, ADC, expansion headers

Creator Ci40 
The Creator Ci40 board  is based on a cXT200 chip optimized specifically for IoT applications which contains a dual-core, dual-threaded 550 MHz MIPS interAptiv CPU with 32k I&D L1 cache and 512k L2 cache and an IEEE754 Floating Point Unit coupled with an Ensigma C4500 Wi-Fi radio processor. In addition, the board provides:
 512 MB of NAND flash memory and 256 MB DDR3 SDRAM
 1 x micro SD card
 802.11b/g/n/ac 2x2 Wi-Fi, 802.15.4 6LoWPAN dedicated chip, Bluetooth 4.1 (Classic + Smart, respectively)
 Dedicated TPM chip
 1 x RJ45 Ethernet port
 1 x 3.5mm input/output jack, 1 x S/PDIF input/output connector
 32 x GPIO, 2 x mikroBUS i/f, 4 x PWM, 1 x SPI, 2 x UART, 2 x I2C, 5 x ADC, expansion headers, 14-pin EJTAG connector, 9 x indicator LEDs (7 x I/O, 1 x MCU),
 1 x micro USB 2.0 OTG

Software 
All Creator boards support the Creator IoT Framework, an open source software package based on the LWM2M protocol developed by the Open Mobile Alliance.

References 

Computer science education in the United Kingdom
Educational hardware
Linux-based devices
MIPS architecture
Single-board computers